The 1984 Kansas State Wildcats football team represented Kansas State University in the 1984 NCAA Division I-A football season.  The team's head football coach was Jim Dickey.  The Wildcats played their home games in KSU Stadium.  1984 saw the Wildcats finish with a record of 3–7–1, and a 2–4–1 record in Big Eight Conference play.

Schedule

References

Kansas State
Kansas State Wildcats football seasons
Kansas State Wildcats football